The Eastern New Mexico News is a daily broadsheet newspaper published in Clovis in Curry County, New Mexico. It was formed in 2016 by the merger of the Clovis News Journal and the Portales News-Tribune. Owner Clovis Media had acquired both papers from Freedom Communications in 2012.

Clovis Media also owns the Quay County Sun in Tucumcari.

External links

References

Newspapers published in New Mexico
Clovis, New Mexico
Freedom Communications